The Consumer Council of Norway (Norwegian: Forbrukerrådet) is a Norwegian government agency and consumer protection organisation established in 1953. It works to increase consumer influence in society, to contribute to consumer-friendly developments, and to promote measures that strengthen the position of consumers. The Norwegian government funds the Consumer Council, leaving it free to develop an independent consumer policy and independent of commercial interests and other organisations.

Structure 

The Consumer Council has its own board of directors and statutes laid down by the Ministry of Children and Equality and is chaired by Director Inger Lise Blyverket.

The Consumer Council employs about 140 people, who work at the headquarters in Oslo and at the offices in Tromsø/Svalbard, Stavanger and Skien, organised into four departments: communication and digital services, consumer policy, dispute resolution, and staff.

The Consumer Council helps put consumer questions on the agenda and promote consumers' interests by influencing authorities, organisations, and businesses; educating consumers through information, advice, and guidance; and helping individual consumers.

Consumer policy 

The Consumer policy department runs the Consumer Council's work to influence governmental and business life in a consumer-friendly direction through dialogue, impact work and publications. The policy work is aimed at areas that have a high economic impact for consumers, where consumer satisfaction is low, and potentially could to affect all sectors.

In some cases, existing regulations are not enough, and the Consumer Council is therefore working politically to strengthen legal consumer protection. In other cases, the work is about affecting the competitive situation and how markets operate.

The Consumer Council also has an extensive international cooperation with sister organizations in Europe, and especially with the umbrella organization in Brussels; BEUC.

The priority policy areas of the Consumer Council are Housing, Digital services, Finance, Commerce, and Public services.

Assisting consumers 

Each year, 80 000 consumers directly contact the Norwegian Consumer Council for assistance.

The Consumer Council also offers free legal dispute resolution between consumers and business, and helps resolving about 10 000 formal disputes every year.

The dispute resolution offices are located in Skien, Stavanger and Tromsø. In addition, four employees work at Svalbard, as part of the Tromsø office.

Profiled cases 

 On January 25, 2006, the Consumer Council filed a complaint regarding iTunes' Term of Service.
 On October 15, 2015 The Consumer Council filed a lawsuit against Norway's largest bank, DNB on behalf of 180,000 consumers.
 On May 25, 2016 The Consumer Council read app terms for 32 hours to demonstrate what reading the terms and conditions actually entails. The stunt gained world wide attention. 
 On June 27, 2018, the Consumer Council of Norway published the report "Deceived by Design: How Tech Companies Use Dark Patterns to Discourage Us from Exercising Our Rights to Privacy" which provides examples of how Google, Facebook and Microsoft nudge users into choosing the less privacy friendly options. 
 On January 14, 2020 the Consumer Council of Norway published the report Out of control How consumers are exploited by the online advertising industry which provides examples on how 10 popular mobile were transmitted user data to at least 135 different third parties involved in advertising and/or behavioural profiling.
 In June, 2021, they published a report, Time to Ban Surveillance Based Advertising detailing the socially detrimental effects of surveillance advertising and a call for it to be banned.
 In May, 2022, they published another report, INSERT COIN - How the gaming industry exploits consumers using loot boxes concerning a wide variety of problems with the marketing and use of loot box mechanics in video games, and a call for the use of loot boxes to be far more regulated or potentially banned.

References

External links 
 Official website 

Government agencies of Norway
1953 establishments in Norway
Consumer rights agencies